Kadov is a municipality and village in Strakonice District in the South Bohemian Region of the Czech Republic. It has about 400 inhabitants.

Administrative parts
Villages of Lnářský Málkov, Mračov, Pole and Vrbno are administrative parts of Kadov.

References

Villages in Strakonice District